The Samsung Gear S3 is a Tizen-based circular smartwatch developed by Samsung Electronics. It was released on 18 November 2016.

There are two models of the Gear S3, Classic and Frontier.  The Classic has a silver watch case and black leather band, while the Frontier has a black watch case and rubber band. Both are rated IP68 (water resistant) and have GPS and heart rate monitor sensors.  One notable feature is that the bezel ring rotates as part of the user interface, although users can also navigate by swiping the screen and/or using the two buttons on the side.

The Gear S3's successor, the Samsung Galaxy Watch, was released 9 August 2018.

Comparison of models

The "LTE" models are further divided into sub-models depending on the target country and Service Provider cellular infrastructure available.

See also
 Samsung Galaxy

References

External links 
 Official page
 New Tizen 3.0 Update Now Available For Samsung Gear S3

Tizen-based devices
Products introduced in 2016
Smartwatches
Samsung wearable devices